Lagawe, officially the Municipality of Lagawe  is a 4th class municipality and capital of the province of Ifugao, Philippines. According to the 2020 census, it has a population of 18,876 people.

Geography

Barangays
Lagawe is politically subdivided into 20 barangays. These barangays are headed by elected officials: Barangay Captain, Barangay Council, whose members are called Barangay Councilors. All are elected every three years.

 Abinuan
 Banga
 Boliwong
 Burnay
 Buyabuyan
 Caba
 Cudog
 Dulao
 Jucbong
 Luta
 Montabiong
 Olilicon
 Poblacion South
 Poblacion East
 Poblacion North
 Poblacion West
 Ponghal
 Pullaan
 Tungngod
 Tupaya

Climate

Demographics

Economy

Government
Lagawe, belonging to the lone congressional district of the province of Ifugao, is governed by a mayor designated as its local chief executive and by a municipal council as its legislative body in accordance with the Local Government Code. The mayor, vice mayor, and the councilors are elected directly by the people through an election which is being held every three years.

Elected officials

References

External links

 [ Philippine Standard Geographic Code]
Philippine Census Information
Local Governance Performance Management System

Municipalities of Ifugao
Provincial capitals of the Philippines